The  is a railway line operated by the Japanese private railway operator Keio Corporation in the western suburbs of Tokyo, connecting  in Tokyo with  in Musashino City. It is not physically connected to the Keio Main Line Network, but a transfer is available at Meidaimae Station. This line is  gauge, unlike other Keio lines which are  gauge.

Operation
Keio operates two types of trains on the line: all-stations  or  services and limited-stop  services. During the daytime off-peak, one local and one express operate every 8 minutes on the line.

Stations
All stations are in Tokyo.

History
The track gauge used was the same  as for other Odakyu lines, and the overhead power supply was 600 V DC.

After World War II, Greater Tokyu was divided, and the Inokashira Line came under Keio ownership.

A line known as the  connected Daita-nichōme Station (now Shindaita Station) on the Inokashira Line with Setagaya-Nakahara Station (now Setagaya-Daita Station) on the Odakyū Odawara Line from June 1945, but this was closed in 1952. The track and overhead wire was entirely removed in 1953, although some traces of the trackbed remain today.

From 25 February 1969, following the voltage being increased to 1500 V DC, air-conditioned trains were introduced on the Inokashira Line. From 30 April 1971, the 3000 series trains were lengthened to 5-cars, and from 15 December 1971, limited-stop "Express" services started.

From 22 February 2013, station numbering was introduced on Keio lines. Inokashira Line stations were numbered prefixed with the letters "IN".

Rolling stock
 Keio 1000 series 5-car EMUs (since 9 January 1996)

Former rolling stock
 Keio 3000 series 5-car EMUs (30 December 1962 – 2011)

See also
 List of railway lines in Japan

References
This article incorporates material from the corresponding article in the Japanese Wikipedia

External links

 Keio Corporation website

 
Inokashira Line
Railway lines in Tokyo
1067 mm gauge railways in Japan
Railway lines opened in 1933
1933 establishments in Japan